Eryxia gracilipes is a species of leaf beetle of Yemen, described by Édouard Lefèvre in 1890.

References

Eumolpinae
Beetles of Asia
Insects of the Arabian Peninsula
Taxa named by Édouard Lefèvre
Beetles described in 1890
Endemic fauna of Yemen